Hotel Paradis is a 1931 Danish drama directed by George Schnéevoigt. The film, based on a novel by Einar Rousthøj, stars Eyvind Johan-Svendsen and Inger Stender. The film was also known as Hotel Paradisets hemlighed (The Secret of the Paradise Hotel).

Cast
Eyvind Johan-Svendsen as Heinrich Schultz/Bremer 
Karen Caspersen as Emilie Schultz/Bremer 
Kirsten Møller as Rosa Schultz som barn 
Inger Stender as Rosa Schultz som voksen 
Holger Reenberg as Mølleren 
Jon Iversen as Præsten 
Svend Melsing as Skibsofficerens søn 
Elith Pio as Fridolin 
Karen Poulsen as Tosse-Grete 
Robert Schmidt as Skarpretter 
Ragnar Arvedson as Henemann 
Anna-Lisa Baude as Tok-Greta 
John Ekman as Henrik Schultze 
Gösta Gustafson as Fridolin 
Gun Holmqvist as Rosa 
Knut Jarlow as Lt. von Kraków 
Gunnel Lindgren as Young Rosa 
Ester Roeck-Hansen as Emilie 
Harry Roeck-Hansen as Kleinsorg

External links

1930s Danish-language films
1931 films
Films directed by George Schnéevoigt
1931 drama films
Danish drama films
Danish black-and-white films